Anna Swenonis (died 31 July 1527) was a Swedish manuscript illuminator. 

She was a nun of the Bridgettine order in the Vadstena Abbey from 1478, and served as a prioress for a time. 

She is known as the author of the manuscripts known as AM 422 and Ups C 475.  She is pointed out as the artist of the illuminated manuscript known as a copy of the Prayer book of Ingegerd Ambjörnsdotter from 1501–1527, which is now kept as the National Library of Sweden.

References

1527 deaths
16th-century Swedish nuns
16th-century Swedish artists
16th-century women artists
Manuscript illuminators
15th-century Swedish nuns